This is a list of songs recorded and released by British pop group Bucks Fizz

0–9 
10,9,8,7,6,5,4

A 
Always Thinking of You
Another Night
Are You Ready

B 
Because of Susan
Breaking and Entering
Breaking Me Up
Brillar

C 
Censored
Cold War
The Company You Keep

D 
Don't Pay the Ferryman (Live)
Don't Stop
Don't Think You're Fooling Me
Don't Turn Back

E 
Easy Love
El Mundo de Illusion
Eso Fue Ayer
Every Dream Has Broken
Evil Man

F 
Fly Away (unreleased Polydor track)

G 
Getting Kinda Lonely
Give a Little Love
Golden Days

H 
Heart of Stone
Here's Looking at You
Hou Siente Soledades

I 
I Can't Live Without Love
Identity
I'd Like to Say I Love You
I Do It All for You
 If Paradise is Half as Nice
If You Can't Stand the Heat
If You're Right
I Hear Talk
I Love Music
Indebted to You
I Need Your Love
In Your Eyes
Invisible
It's Got to Be Love
I Used to Love the Radio

J 
January's Gone

K 
Keep Each Other Warm

L 
Lady of the Night
The Land of Make Believe
Let's Get Wet
London Town
Love Dies Hard
Love in a World Gone Mad
Love the One You're With

M 
Magical
Making Your Mind Up
Midnight Reservation
Move Over (I'm Driving)
My Camera Never Lies

N 
New Beginning (Mamba Seyra)
Noches Sin Ti
Now Those Days Are Gone
Now You're Gone

O 
Oh Suzanne
One of Those Nights
One Touch (Don't Mean Devotion)
One Touch Too Much
One Way Love
Otre Noche

P 
Piece of the Action
Pulling Me Under
Putting the Heat On

Q

R 
The Right Situation
Rules of the Game
Run for Your Life
Running Out of Time

S 
She Cries
Shine On
Shot Me Through the Heart
Skin on Skin
Soul Motion
Stepping Out
Surrender Your Heart

T 
Takin' Me Higher
Talking in Your Sleep
Tears on the Ballroom Floor
These Boots Are Made for Walkin'
Thief in the Night
Too Hard
Took it to the Limit
Total Attraction (unreleased 1983 song)
Twentieth Century Hero

U

V 
Via Libre

W 
What Am I Gonna Do
What's Love Got to Do With It
What's One Lonely Woman
When the Love Has Gone
When We Were at War
When We Were Young
Where Do I Go Now
Where the Ending Starts

X

Y 
Yo Se Que Es Amor
You and Your Heart so Blue
You Love Love
Young Hearts

Z 

Bucks Fizz